Veselinka "Vesa" Šarić (born in 1971) is a Croatian former professional basketball player.

Playing career
Veselinka started playing basketball at age 11 in her hometown of Šibenik. As a senior, she played for the local club Elemes from the end of the 1980s until 1994, when she was pregnant with her son Dario.

Later, she played several years for the club before finishing her professional playing career. In 2004 she was appointed as head coach of the local women club, ŽKK Vidici Dalmostan, which under her command entered Croatian Women's Basketball League.

Personal life
Veselinka Crvak was born in Šibenik. 

She is married to the former basketball player Predrag Šarić. Šarić is the mother of Dario and Dana Šarić, both basketball players.

Achievements
 Yugoslav Women's Basketball League 
 Champion (1): 1991
 Vicechampion (3): 1988, 1989, 1990

References 

1971 births
Living people
Basketball players from Šibenik
Croatian women's basketball players
Croatian women's basketball coaches